Siniristi (Finnish: Blue Cross, until 1933 Tapparamies, (Finnish: the Axman)) was a Finnish Nazi magazine published between 1931 and 1939 and published by Publishing Company Oy Vasara that was operated by Gunnar von Hertzen and Y. W. Jalander. Its material consisted mainly of anti-Semitic propaganda adopted from Nazi Germany. The authors of the magazine included the well-known Finnish-Swedish Nazi Thorvald Oljemark.

Siniristi was a deeply antisemitic magazine, and its antisemitism was mainly based on Christian antisemitism, which was the dominant current in Finnish society. Tahvo Liljeblad published many articles on the relations of Christians and Jews: to him Jesus was the most powerful opponent of the Jews and was killed for challenging the teachings of the rabbis "which are fatal to humanity". As punishment the Jews were cursed and scattered by God. In 1933 Siniristi published an exposé on the Talmud which supposedly contained attacks on Christianity, because the Jews understood Christianity stood against their world-conquest plans.

In 1939 Siniristi was replaced by Kustaa Vaasa magazine.

References

Archives
 National Library digital archives of Tapparamies
 National Library digital archives of Siniristi

External links

1931 establishments in Finland
Antisemitism in Finland
Antisemitic publications
Propaganda newspapers and magazines
1939 disestablishments in Finland
Weekly magazines published in Finland
Magazines established in 1931
Magazines disestablished in 1939
Fascist newspapers and magazines
Defunct political magazines published in Finland
Magazines published in Helsinki